Petrovka is a former village on Karelian Isthmus, about 15 km to the north of Viipuri (now Vyborg), where the battle of Tali-Ihantala took place in 1944.

Location: 

Karelian Isthmus
Former populated places in Russia
Former subdivisions of Leningrad Oblast
Cultural heritage monuments of regional significance in Leningrad Oblast